In This House of Brede is a novel by Rumer Godden published in 1969 by Viking in the US and by Macmillan in the UK.

Synopsis
The novel is a portrait of religious life in England that centers on Philippa Talbot, a highly successful professional woman and self-described free-thinker and renegade, who leaves her comfortable life among the London elite to join a cloistered Benedictine community of contemplative Roman Catholic nuns. It begins in 1954, as Philippa enters the monastery, Brede Abbey; continues through her solemn vows in the changing, post-Second Vatican Council environment; and ends as Philippa reluctantly accepts the call to lead a new Benedictine foundation in Japan, where she spent part of her childhood.

From the publisher: For most of her adult life, Philippa Talbot has been a successful British professional. Now in her forties, the World War II–widow has made a startling decision: She's giving up her civil service career and elite social standing to join a convent as a postulant Roman Catholic nun. In Sussex in the south of England, Philippa begins her new life inside Brede Abbey, a venerable, 130-year-old Benedictine monastery. Taking her place among a diverse group of extraordinary women, young and old, she is welcomed into the surprisingly rich and complex world of the devout, whom faith, fate, and circumstance have led there. From their personal stories, both uplifting and heartbreaking, Philippa draws great strength in the weeks, months, and years that follow, as the confidence, conflicts, and poignant humanity of her fellow sisters serve to validate her love and sacred purpose. But a time of great upheaval in the hierarchy of the Catholic Church approaches as the winds of change blow at gale force. And for the financially troubled Brede and those within, it will take no less than a miracle to weather the storm.

Adaptations
In 1975, CBS made a TV film of this book, filmed in both Ireland and England, starring Diana Rigg (as Philippa), Pamela Brown, Gwen Watford, Denis Quilley, Judi Bowker and Nicholas Clay.

Cultural references
The novel's fictional setting, Brede Abbey, is modeled on Stanbrook Abbey, formerly located in Worcestershire. In the book's introduction, Godden wrote that the characters were fictional but "many of the episodes are based on fact" and credits the lives and sayings of Dame Laurentia McLachland and Sister Mary Ann McArdle of Stanbrook Abbey. Godden's introduction also thanks two other Benedictine Abbeys of Talacre, in Wales, and Ryde, on the Isle of Wight (St. Cecilia's Abbey).

References

English novels
Novels about religion
Nuns in fiction
British novels adapted into films
1969 British novels
Novels by Rumer Godden
Macmillan Publishers books